Agyrta dux is a moth of the subfamily Arctiinae. It was described by Francis Walker in 1854. It is found on St. Lucia and in Honduras, Guatemala and Venezuela.

References

Moths described in 1854
Arctiinae
Moths of the Caribbean
Moths of Central America
Moths of South America